The 1938 George Washington Colonials football team was an American football team that represented George Washington University as an independent during the 1938 college football season. In its first season under head coach William Reinhart, the team compiled a 5–4 record, scored 82 points, and allowed opponents to score 82 points.

Schedule

References

George Washington
George Washington Colonials football seasons
George Washington Colonials football